Ivan Sergeevich Vishnevskiy (born February 18, 1988) is a Russian former professional ice hockey defenceman.

He played in the National Hockey League (NHL),  with the Dallas Stars, the organization that drafted him in the first round, 27th overall, in the 2006 NHL Entry Draft. He was also a member of both the Atlanta Thrashers and Chicago Blackhawks organizations, though he failed to make an NHL-level appearance with either. Vishnevskiy played the majority of his professional career in the Kontinental Hockey League (KHL)

Playing career

Amateur
Vishnevskiy was selected 27th overall in the first round of the 2006 NHL Entry Draft by the Dallas Stars, selected out of the Quebec Major Junior Hockey League (QMJHL)'s Rouyn-Noranda Huskies. He was originally the Huskies' second pick in the 2005 CHL Import Draft, later being selected for the 2006 Top Prospects game. On July 18, 2007, Vishnevskiy was signed by the Dallas Stars to a three-year, entry level contract.

Professional
After playing an additional season of major junior with the Huskies, Vishnevskiy made his professional debut in the 2008–09 season with the Peoria Rivermen of the American Hockey League (AHL). With the Stars already mathematically eliminated from qualification to the 2009 Stanley Cup playoffs, Vishnevskiy was recalled from loan with the Rivermen and made his NHL debut with the Stars against the Minnesota Wild on April 7, 2009. Two days later, he posted his first career NHL point, an assist, in a victory against the Colorado Avalanche. He played in three games with the Stars before he was reassigned to join the Rivermen for the team's run in the 2009 Calder Cup playoffs.

Vishnevskiy was assigned to the Stars' new AHL affiliate, the Texas Stars, to begin the 2009–10 season. He appeared in two games with Dallas, later gaining infamous League-wide attention when he mistakingly lost control of the puck to score into his own net with the goaltender pulled against the San Jose Sharks on December 21, 2009. After being reassigned to the AHL, he was leading all Texas defencemen with eight goals when on February 9, 2010, he was traded to the Atlanta Thrashers, along with a fourth-round draft pick (Ivan Telegin) in 2010, in exchange for goaltender Kari Lehtonen. Vishnevskiy was then subsequently assigned to the Thrashers' AHL affiliate, the Chicago Wolves, for the remainder of the season.

In the 2010–11 off-season, Vishnevskiy's tenure with Atlanta was short-lived when he was traded, along with a second-round draft pick in 2011, to the newly crowned Stanley Cup champions, the Chicago Blackhawks, in exchange for Andrew Ladd on July 1, 2010.

Assigned to the Blackhawks' AHL affiliate, the Rockford IceHogs, for the entirety of the 2010–11 season, Vishnevskiy then signed a one-year contract with Atlant Mytishchi of the KHL on May 17, 2011.

Career statistics

Regular season and playoffs

References

External links

Ivan Vishnevskiy's profile at Russian Prospects.com

1988 births
Atlant Moscow Oblast players
Avtomobilist Yekaterinburg players
Chicago Wolves players
Dallas Stars draft picks
Dallas Stars players
HC Lada Togliatti players
Living people
National Hockey League first-round draft picks
Sportspeople from Barnaul
Peoria Rivermen (AHL) players
HK Poprad players
Rockford IceHogs (AHL) players
Rouyn-Noranda Huskies players
Russian ice hockey defencemen
Salavat Yulaev Ufa players
HC Spartak Moscow players
Texas Stars players
Torpedo Nizhny Novgorod players
Traktor Chelyabinsk players
Russian expatriate sportspeople in the United States
Russian expatriate sportspeople in Canada
Russian expatriate sportspeople in Slovakia
Russian expatriate ice hockey people
Expatriate ice hockey players in Canada
Expatriate ice hockey players in the United States
Expatriate ice hockey players in Slovakia